Spirodecanedione is a chemical compound. It features spirodecane with two ketones attached.

See also 
 Spirodecane
 Azaspirodecanedione
 Glutarimide
 Ketone

References

Diketones
Spiro compounds